Fred Harder (8 August 1896 Detroit, Michigan – 17 March 1956 Dayton, Ohio) was an American racecar driver.

Indy 500 results

References

1896 births
1956 deaths
Indianapolis 500 drivers
Racing drivers from Detroit